The 43d Fighter Squadron is part of the 325th Fighter Wing at Tyndall Air Force Base, Florida.  It conducts advanced fighter training for F-22 Raptor pilots.

The squadron is one of the oldest in the United States Air Force, its origins dating to 13 June 1917, when it was organized at Kelly Field, Texas as the 43d Aero Squadron.   The squadron deployed to England as part of the American Expeditionary Force during World War I.   The squadron saw combat during World War II, served in the Vietnam War and later became part of the Alaskan Air Command (AAC) during the Cold War.

Mission
The 43d Fighter Squadron is responsible for providing air dominance training for the F-22 Raptor.

History

World War I 
The 43d Fighter Squadron traces its lineage to the 43d Aero Squadron, first activated 13 June 1917, at Camp Kelly, Texas.  In March 1918, the squadron moved to England, where it trained until reassigned to France where it landed on 25 October, reaching on the same day the Air Service Replacement Concentration Barracks at St. Maixent.  Ordered to 3rd Aviation Instruction Center, the squadron arrived at the Issoudun Aerodrome on 1 November. The Armistice signed on 11 November made it redundant, and it stayed at Issoudun until early 1919, when it moved to the harbor of Bordeaux, France, leaving France on 18 March, bound for the United States

Inter-war years
The 43d was reactivated on 22 July 1922, at Kelly Field, Texas, and was redesignated the 43d School Squadron in January 1923.  The squadron flew various aircraft, including the DH-4, Spad XIII, SE-5, MB-7, AT-4, AT-5, PW-9, P-1, and P-12.  The 43d became known as the "Hornets" as depicted by their emblem, a poised Vespa Maculata, or American "Yellow Jacket," the most formidable of the wasp family, surrounded by an ovate cloud.  The emblem was approved in 1924 and the Hornet signifies the speed, agility and hard-hitting capabilities of the squadron while the cloud represents their domain - the skies. In March 1935, the 43d was redesignated the 43d Pursuit Squadron, flying as part of the 3d Wing Advanced Flying School until it was inactivated in September 1936.

World War II

Re-established in 1939 as the 43d Pursuit Squadron (Interceptor) and activated on 1 February 1940 at Albrook Field, Panama Canal Zone. This unit was part of the build-up of the Canal Zone's defenses as war approached.  Assigned to the 16th Pursuit Group (Interceptor), and equipped with Curtis P-36A Hawks.  In July 1941, the squadron began to convert from P-36As to new Curtiss P-40 Warhawks and, upon completion of this conversion, "A" Flight was transferred to the Top Secret "Project X" on 18 August. This, of course, was the reinforcement of Trinidad.  Another flight later moved on to Zandery Field, Surinam, by January 1942.

After the Japanese Attack on Pearl Harbor, the unit moved to La Joya #1 (Pacora) Airfield in Panama in January 1942.  In Panama, the squadron was assigned to the Panama Interceptor Com¬mand (PIC). Re-designated as the 43d Fighter Squadron on 13 June 1942.  On 20 August, the squadron began re-equipping with the new Bell P-39 Airacobra, while the Zandery Field and Trinidad detachments remained. active with P-40Cs On 1 September the detachments aircraft were reassigned to the XXXVI Fighter Command, Antilles Air Task Force, although its personnel returned home to the main body of the squadron.

Operating air defense patrols throughout 1943 from La Joya, pn 9 February 1944, the squadron finally moved to Howard Field, having been deployed to an auxiliary base longer than any other Squadron in Sixth Air Force.  In March, the squadron was selected to serve as a "model" squadron for the Brazilian 1st Fighter Squadron, which was in training with the 30th Fighter Squadron at Aguadulce Field.  During this operational observation, four Brazilian officers and 36 enlisted men were briefly attached to the squadron.  Moved back to Howard Field in August 1943.   One more move was made to France Field on 10 January 1945, replacing the 32d Fighter Squadron.

Unit activities ran down with the end of the war in Europe in May 1945. The squadron ceased all flying activities in June. By October 1945, the squadron was reduced to a non-operational administrative organization. Inactivated on 15 October 1946.

Vietnam War

The squadron lay dormant nearly two decades before it was awakened as the 43d Tactical Fighter Squadron at MacDill Air Force Base, Florida, in January 1964 flying the F-84 Thunderstreak.  The Hornets converted from the F-84 to the F-4 Phantom II, and in August 1965, deployed to Clark Air Base, Philippines, where they were in reserve support to the 47th Tactical Fighter Squadron who were flying combat missions over Southeast Asia from Ubon Royal Thai Air Force Base, Thailand.

In November 1965, the Hornets became the first fighter squadron assigned to Cam Ranh Air Base, South Vietnam, with an advance party arriving on 28 October.  During its time in Southeast Asia, the squadron flew 1,207 combat missions and earned the Air Force Outstanding Unit Award for its service.  In January 1966, the 43rd TFS returned to MacDill AFB, to serve as an F-4 replacement-training unit until March 1970.

Alaskan Service

In June 1970, the 43 TFS was moved to Elmendorf Air Force Base, Alaska, under the 21st Composite Wing, and from 1991 the 21st Tactical Fighter Wing.  The squadron was one of two units assigned to Alaskan Air Command.  Flying the F-4E Phantom II, the 43d inherited a dual mission of Alaskan air defense and close air support for U.S. Army forces.  In addition to flying out of Elmendorf AFB in Anchorage, the squadron also sat air defense alert at King Salmon and Galena Air Force Stations.

The squadron assumed North American Aerospace Defense Command air defense alert in October 1970 and between 1970 and 1982, the squadron's pilots intercepted more than 100 Soviet aircraft in Alaskan air space. In 1976 the 43rd TFS won the Hughes Trophy for the best air-to-air squadron in the United States Air Force.

In 1982, the 43 TFS began converting to the McDonnell Douglas F-15A Eagle.  Without help from a combat ready unit, the squadron developed its own F-15 training program and completed the first ever F-15 low runway condition reading tests.  The squadron continued to provide air defense for North America until 1 January 1994, when it was inactivated.

Return to fighter training
On 25 October 2002, The 43d Fighter Squadron was reactivated with a new mission and a new aircraft.  Assigned to the 325th Fighter Wing, Air Education and Training Command, Tyndall Air Force Base, Florida, the 43 FS is the first squadron to provide training for Air Force pilots in the F-22 Raptor. The squadron transitioned to Air Combat Command when the 325th Fighter Wing assumed an operational mission, however the 43 FS continued to train Raptor pilots.

Lineage
 43d Aero Squadron
 Organized as the 43d Provisional Squadron on 13 June 1917
 Redesignated 43d Aero Squadron on 26 June 1917
 Demobilized on 17 April 1919
 Reconstituted and consolidated with the 43d School Squadron on 8 April 1924

 43d Pursuit Squadron
 Authorized as the 43d School Squadron on 10 June 1922
 Organized as the 43d Squadron (School) on 7 July 1922
 Redesignated 43d School Squadron on 25 January 1923
 Consolidated with the 43d Aero Squadron on 8 April 1924
 Redesignated 43d Pursuit Squadron on 1 March 1935
 Inactivated on 1 September 1936
 Disbanded on 1 January 1938
 Consolidated with the 43d Tactical Fighter Squadron on 27 March 1964 effective 22 December 1939

 43d Fighter Squadron
 Constituted as the 43d Pursuit Squadron (Interceptor) on 22 December 1939
 Activated on 1 February 1940
 Redesignated: 43d Fighter Squadron on 15 May 1942
 Redesignated: 43d Fighter Squadron, Single Engine on 12 April 1944
 Redesignated: 43d Fighter Squadron, Two Engine on 13 January 1945
 Redesignated: 43d Fighter Squadron, Single Engine on 8 January 1946
 Inactivated on 15 October 1946
 Redesignated 43d Tactical Fighter Squadron, activated and organized on 8 January 1964
 Consolidated with the 43d Pursuit Squadron on 27 March 1964 effective 22 December 1939
 Redesignated 43d Fighter Squadron on 26 September 1991
 Inactivated on 1 January 1994
 Activated on 1 October 2002

Assignments

 Unknown, 13 June – 24 August 1917
 Fairfield Aviation General Supply Depot, 25 August 1917
 Unknown, 18 December 1917 – 24 October 1918
 Air Service Replacement Concentration Barracks, 25 October 1918
 3d Aviation Instruction Center, 1 November–c. 5 January 1919
 Commanding General, Services of Supply, January–17 April 1919
 10th Group (School) (later 10th School Group), 7 July 1922
 Air Corps Advanced Flying School, 16 July 1931
 3d Wing (attached to Air Corps Advanced Flying School), 1 March 1935 – 1 September 1936
 16th Pursuit Group (later 16th Fighter Group), 1 February 1940
 XXVI Fighter Command, 1 November 1943

 6th Fighter Wing, 25 August – 15 October 1946
 15th Tactical Fighter Wing, 8 January 1964 (attached to 405th Fighter Wing, c. 20 August 1965, 12th Tactical Fighter Wing, 1 November 1965-c. 4 January 1966)
 21st Composite Wing, 15 July 1970
 343d Tactical Fighter Group, 15 November 1977
 21st Tactical Fighter Wing, 1 January 1980
 21st Operations Group, 26 September 1991
 3d Operations Group, 19 December 1991 – 1 January 1994
 325th Operations Group, 1 October 2002 – present

Stations

 Camp Kelly (later Kelly Field, Texas, 13 June 1917
 Wilbur Wright Field, Ohio, 25 August 1917
 Ellington Field, Texas, 18 December 1917 – 17 February 1918
 South Carlton, England, 16 March 1918
 Codford, England, 14 October 1918
 St. Maixent, France, 25 October 1918
 Issoudun Aerodrome, France, 1 November 1918
 Bordeaux, France, c. 6 January – 18 March 1919
 Hazelhurst Field, New York, c. 5–17 April 1919
 Kelly Field, Texas, 7 July 1922 – 1 September 1936

 Albrook Field, Panama Canal Zone, 1 February 1940
 La Joya Airfield, Panama, 13 July 1942
 Howard Field, Panama Canal Zone, 9 February 1944
 La Chorrera Airfield, Panama, 6 April 1944
 Howard Field, Panama Canal Zone, 29 August 1944
 France Field, Panama Canal Zone, 10 January 1945 – 15 October 1946
 MacDill Air Force Base, Florida, 8 January 1964
 Deployed at Clark Air Base, Philippines, c. 20 August – 31 October 1965
 Deployed at Cam Ranh Air Base, South Vietnam, 1 November 1965 - c. 4 January 1966
 Elmendorf Air Force Base, Alaska, 15 July 1970 – 1 January 1994
 Tyndall Air Force Base, Florida, 1 October 2002 – 10 September 2018
 Evacuated to Eglin Air Force Base, Florida, 10 September 2018 – present

Aircraft

 Probably Curtiss R-4 (1917–1918)
 Probably Curtiss JN-4 (1917–1918)
 Airco DH.4 (1918)
 SPAD S.XIII (1918)
 Royal Aircraft Factory S.E.5 (1918)
 Thomas-Morse MB-7 (1922–1929)
 Curtiss AT-4 (1922–1929)
 Curtiss AT-5 (1922–1929)
 Curtiss P-1 Hawk (1928–1935)
 Boeing PW-9 (1929–1931)
 Boeing P-12 (1932–1936)
 Curtiss P-36 Hawk (1940–1941)
 Curtiss P-40 Warhawk (1941–1942, 1943–1945)
 Bell P-39 Airacobra (1942–1944)
 Lockheed P-38 Lightning (1945–1946)
 Republic P-47 Thunderbolt (1946)
 Republic F-84 Thunderjet (1964)
 McDonnell F-4 Phantom II (1964–1982)
 McDonnell Douglas F-15 Eagle (1982–1993)
 Lockheed Martin F-22 Raptor (2002–present)

See also

 List of American Aero Squadrons

References

Notes
 Explanatory notes

 Citations

Bibliography

External links
43d Fighter Squadron Fact Sheet

043
Military units and formations in Florida
043